Truimali Ramírez Güity (born 27 March 1998) is a Honduran footballer who plays as a forward for C.D. Olimpia and the Honduras women's national team.

Club career 

In May 2022, Ramírez debuted for American team FA Euro New York in the inaugural season of the USL W League, scoring five goals across eleven games.

Ramírez subsequently rejoined C.D. Olimpia, representing the club at the 2022 UNCAF Women's Interclub Championship in Belén, Costa Rica. She scored Olimpia's only goal in their last game, a 2–1 defeat to Belizean team Jewel Fury.

References

1998 births
Living people
Honduran women's footballers
Women's association football forwards
 Honduran expatriate sportspeople in the United States